Siphamandla Dapo (born 17 November 1989) is a South African cricketer. He was included in the Easterns cricket team squad for the 2015 Africa T20 Cup.

References

External links
 

1989 births
Living people
South African cricketers
Boland cricketers
Easterns cricketers
Cricketers from Port Elizabeth